McConnel is an electoral district of the Legislative Assembly in the Australian state of Queensland. It was created in the 2017 redistribution as essentially a reconfigured version of Brisbane Central.

It covers the Brisbane CBD, as well as the suburbs of Kelvin Grove, Herston, Bowen Hills, Newstead, Teneriffe, Fortitude Valley, Spring Hill, Petrie Terrace and New Farm.

It is named after Mary McConnel, one of Queensland's early European settlers, who came to Queensland in 1849. With her husband David McConnel, they ran the Cressbrook pastoral station. Mary McConnel was a close friend of Diamantina Bowen, the wife of the first Queensland Governor George Bowen, and together with a committee of ladies, they embarked on a program of building hospitals for women and children, such as the Lady Bowen Hospital which provided maternity services. After the Bowens left Queensland, Mary McConnel continued to raise funding to build a children's hospital. The Hospital for Sick Children in Brisbane was opened on 11 March 1878.

From results of the last election, McConnel is estimated to be a marginal seat for the Labor Party with a margin of 3.1%. Grace Grace, the last member for Brisbane Central, transferred to McConnel and won with a modest swing.

The electorate containing what is now the Brisbane CBD has been known variously as Town of Brisbane (1859–1873), Brisbane City (1873–1878), North Brisbane (1878–1888), Brisbane North (1888–1912), Brisbane (1912–1977) and Brisbane Central (1977–2017).

Members for McConnel

Election results

See also
 Electoral districts of Queensland
 Members of the Queensland Legislative Assembly by year
 :Category:Members of the Queensland Legislative Assembly by name

References

Electoral districts of Queensland